Marc-Philippe Daubresse (born 1 August 1953) is a French politician.

Early life and education
Daubresse was born on 1 August 1953 in Lille, Nord. He is a graduate of the École centrale de Lille, the Institut Industriel du Nord, and the Institut d'Administration des Entreprises. He was a member of Jeunesse Etudiante Chrétienne.

Career
In 1974, Daubresse worked as staff member for telecommunications Minister Norbert Segard. He also served as regional chair of the Union pour la Démocratie Française, and later the Union pour un Mouvement Populaire for the Nord.

From 1980 to 1983, Daubresse worked for Bouygues.

From 1986 to 1992, Daubresse was a member of the regional council of Nord-Pas-de-Calais. From January 2001 to March 2008, he was the Vice-President of the Urban Community of Lille Métropole. Since 2003, he has been the President of the Conseil National de l’Habitat, then the Agence Nationale de l'Habitat.

From March to November 2004, Daubresse was Secretary for housing, from November 2004 to May 2005, Deputy Minister for housing and cities. and frome March to November 2010 Minister for Youth and Active Solidarities.

Daubresse has been the mayor of Lambersart from 1988 to 2017.

Political positions
In the Republicans’ 2016 presidential primaries, Daubresse endorsed Nicolas Sarkozy as the party's candidate for the office of President of France.

References

External links
Official website

1953 births
Living people
Politicians from Lille
French Christians
Union for French Democracy politicians
The Republicans (France) politicians
Modern and Humanist France
Government ministers of France
Mayors of places in Hauts-de-France
École centrale de Lille alumni
Lille University of Science and Technology alumni
Deputies of the 12th National Assembly of the French Fifth Republic
Deputies of the 13th National Assembly of the French Fifth Republic
Deputies of the 14th National Assembly of the French Fifth Republic
Senators of Nord (French department)